Entomophobia is a genus of flowering plants from the orchid family, Orchidaceae. Only one species is known, Entomophobia kinabaluensis, endemic to the Island of Borneo. The epithet "kinabaluensis" refers to Mount Kinabalu in Sabah.

See also 
 List of Orchidaceae genera

References 

de Vogel, E.F. (1984) Blumea 30(1): 199.
Berg Pana, H. 2005. Handbuch der Orchideen-Namen. Dictionary of Orchid Names. Dizionario dei nomi delle orchidee. Ulmer, Stuttgart
Pridgeon, A.M., Cribb, P.J., Chase, M.C. & Rasmussen, F.N. (2006) Epidendroideae (Part One). Genera Orchidacearum 4: 60ff. Oxford University Press.

External links 

Orchids of Borneo
Plants described in 1920
Coelogyninae